The Battle of Loschniza took place on 23 November 1812, between parts of the French army and parts of the Russian armies. The French army under Oudinot defeated the Russian troops under Chichagov.

Background
The French had suffered a defeat just one week earlier during the Battle of Krasnoi. Napoleon's army amounted to no more than 20,000 combatants. However, the union with Victor, Oudinot and Dombrowski at the Bobr brought the numerical strength of the Grande Armée back up to some 49,000 French combatants as well as about 40,000 stragglers. But Minsk had been occupied by Chichagov on 16 November 1812 who reached the Berezina with about 31,500 combatants.

On the 21 November, the Russians under Lambert had occupied Borisov in the morning before Oudinot could come up as the sentries had been ambushed. Dombrowski had about 2000 men left. The Russians casualties were about 2000, including Lambert, mortally wounded. On the 22 November Oudinot got to :be:Loshnitsa, where Corbineau's brigade united with him. But the Russians had destroyed the bridge at Borisov on the same day and held occupied the far bank.

Battle
On 23 November Chichagov took the majority of his army across the Beresina at Borisov and his advance guard reached Losnitza. The advance guard attacked Oudinot without waiting to be reinforced and was thrashed. Oudinot marched to Borisov and ejected the Russians.

Aftermath
The damage of the Borisov bridge increased the danger for the remains of the Grande Armée that was surrounded by three Russian armies and was no longer strong enough for a breakthrough. A quick construction of a new bridge had to be done and Oudinot had forded the Beresina at Studienka on 22 November, see Battle of Berezina.

See also
List of battles of the French invasion of Russia

Notes

References

External links
 

Battles of the French invasion of Russia
Battles of the Napoleonic Wars
Battles involving France
Battles involving Poland
Battles involving Russia
Conflicts in 1812
November 1812 events
1812 in the Russian Empire
1812 in Belarus
Military history of Belarus
Minsk Governorate